Teola Pearl Hunter (born February 5, 1933) is an American educator and politician.

Born in Detroit, Michigan, Hunter graduated from Cass Technical High School in 1949. She received her bachelor's degree in education in 1958 from University of Detroit Mercy and her master's degree in elementary school guidance and counseling in 1971 from Wayne State University. She then taught in the Detroit public schools. From 1981 until her resignation in January 1992 Hunter served in the Michigan House of Representatives and was a Democrat. She was appointed deputy director for the Wayne County Health and Community Services Department.

See also 
 Triette Reeves

References 

1933 births
Living people
Politicians from Detroit
University of Detroit Mercy alumni
Wayne State University alumni
Educators from Michigan
American women educators
Women state legislators in Michigan
Democratic Party members of the Michigan House of Representatives
21st-century American women